Molly Dingle MBE (1892–1974) was an educator, born in St. John's, Newfoundland. Dingle at the age of 16 began as a teacher's aid at Holloway School, then Methodist College, and joined the staff in 1915. When she retired in 1952, she was its principal.

Career

She received her education at Presbyterian Hall at St. John's and the Holloway School at St. John's, from which she graduated in 1908. In 1908 she got a position as a teacher-assistant and in 1914 attended the Training College at Truro, Nova Scotia, to qualify as a kindergarten teacher. In 1915 she came back to Newfoundland and, with the exception the 1933–34 school year, when she went as an exchange teacher to Dumfernline, Scotland, she spent her teaching career in St. John's, until 1952. She was involved in training teachers at the annual summer schools and because of that was well known among Newfoundland teachers. 
She went to England in 1952 as an exchange teacher and upon her return from England, in 1953,  she was approached by Vera Perlin who wanted her to become part of a new programme she was developing to help educate mentally disabled children. She joined the staff of the first school opened in 1954 and operated from the United Church orphanage on Hamilton Avenue. Over the next two years she visited other schools in Truro, Montreal and England to become acquainted with their methods and programmes. Dingle went on to teach at the Vera Perlin School until age 77.

Awards
In 1949 she received an MBE for her dedication, certificates of merit from both schools and an honorary life membership of the Newfoundland Teachers' Association. Molly also was honoured by the Association for the Help of Retarded Children for her contribution to the work of the organization.

See also
 List of people of Newfoundland and Labrador
 List of communities in Newfoundland and Labrador

References

External links
Newfoundland and Labrador Heritage

1892 births
1974 deaths
People from St. John's, Newfoundland and Labrador
Canadian Members of the Order of the British Empire